Svarfdæla saga is one of the sagas of Icelanders. It was first recorded in the first half of the 14th century. It describes disputes  which arise during the early settlement of Svarfaðardalur, a valley in central north Iceland.

The saga concerns  three generations of a family originating in  Norway.  Thorstein Svarfað comes to Iceland from Namdalen with his youngest son Karl. Most of the saga is about Karl and his relationship with Ljótólf, the local chieftain (goði) .

References

External links
Proverbs in Svarfdæla saga
Full text at the Icelandic Saga Database

Sagas of Icelanders